Vakhtang Jordania (born 9 December 1943, Tbilisi, Georgian SSR, Soviet Union – 4 October 2005, Broadway, Virginia, United States) was a Georgian conductor.

Biography
Born in the Soviet republic of Georgia on 9 December 1943, Jordania studied piano from the age of five. After graduating from the Tbilisi Conservatory, he studied symphonic and operatic conducting at the Leningrad Conservatory, graduating with honors. A top prize at the 1971 Herbert von Karajan Competition catapulted him to the highest circle of Soviet artistry. From his assistantship with Yevgeny Mravinsky until his defection to the United States in 1983, Jordania held positions as music director of the Leningrad Radio Orchestra, the Saratov Philharmonic, and the Kharkiv Philharmonic. The Tchaikovsky Competition was under his baton twice. Conducting for more than one hundred concerts a year, he regularly toured the USSR, collaborating with musicians such as David and Igor Oistrakh, Leonid Kogan, Dmitri Shostakovich, Kiril Kondrashin, and Emil Gilels.

Defection
He defected to the West by being driven across the Finnish-Swedish border in Haaparanta to Luleå, Sweden, and on to Stockholm by Jyrki Koulumies, a Finnish journalist. In Sweden, Jordania and his then lover, Victoria Mullova, were taken by Swedish secret police to a safehouse. They were treated by the authorities just like any other political defectors from the Eastern Bloc, who suggested that the couple stay in a safehouse over the weekend until the American embassy opened, where they then applied for political asylum.  For two days they sat under false names in a safehouse room, not even daring to go outside because their photographs were on the front page of every Swedish and international newspaper. Two days later they were in Washington, D.C. with American visas in their pockets.

Immediately after his defection, Jordania made his Carnegie Hall debut, which was hailed by the New York Times as "a confident and spirited performance ... the full house leaped to its feet." Success followed in England, France, Germany, Austria, the Netherlands, Belgium, Spain, Japan, Korea, Ireland, New Zealand, Australia and South America. In the United States, his appearances in New York, Los Angeles, Salt Lake City, Portland, Minneapolis, Rochester, Denver and Fort Worth brought more critical acclaim. After his defection, he held music director and/or principal guest conductor positions with the Chattanooga Symphony and Opera, the Spokane Symphony, the KBS Symphony Orchestra in Seoul, the Russian Federal Orchestra of Moscow, Daegu City Symphony of South Korea, the St. Petersburg Festival Orchestra of Russia, and Kharkiv Philharmonic of Ukraine, with whom he was appointed for life. Jordania's homeland, the Republic of Georgia, bestowed on him the highest award given to outstanding Georgians, the Ordin of Honor. Also, Ukraine awarded him their highest Medal of Honor for Musical Excellence.

Jordania regularly conducted at many prestigious opera houses in Russia, the United States, Ukraine, and Korea, including the Bolshoi and Kirov Theaters. In the United States he conducted the North American premiere of Dvorák's Rusalka. Right before he died he was the Principal Guest Conductor of the Kharkiv Opera, and the Korean American Opera Company.

He recorded for Melodiya, Koch International Classics, Soundset Summit, Helicon, Trained Ear, Cantabile, and Angelok Classics, and was nominated for Grammy Awards. He also recorded many soundtracks, including the award-winning film Dersu Uzala, directed by Akira Kurosawa. Three of his compact discs were nominated for Grammy Awards (Rachmaninoff Symphony No. 2 with Russian Federal Orchestra, Angelok Classics; in five categories for Hovhaness Symphonies Nos. 46 and 39 with KBS Symphony Orchestra, KOCH International Classics; and music of James Cohn with Latvian National Symphony, XLNT Music).

In 1999 and 2000, the IBLA International Competition hosted the "Jordania Prize", which was named after Jordania, and designed to further the knowledge of young artists who compete in worldwide competitions, Jordania was honored in 2001 with the creation of the Vakhtang Jordania International Conducting Competition in the Ukraine. Since then it has been an annually held event, which attracts contestants from over 25 different countries.

The Jordania Prize of the IBLA International Competition is bestowed in his honor; while the Vakhtang Jordania International Conducting Competition is held annually in the Ukraine. In 2006 the winners were James Feddeck (US), John Traill (UK) and Sasha Mäkilä (Finland).

He was a National Patron of Delta Omicron, an international professional music fraternity.

Jordina is survived by his wife of 18 years, Kimberley Stebbins Jordania of Broadway; a son from his first marriage, Giorgi Jordania, an opera conductor in Tbilisi; a daughter from his second marriage, Nina Jordania of St. Petersburg; two children from his third marriage, Maria Jordania and Dimitri Jordania, both of Broadway; two brothers; and five grandchildren.

See also
 List of Eastern Bloc defectors

References

Further reading
 Reel, James. 2000. "A Conversation with Conductor Vakhtang Jordania". Fanfare: The Magazine for Serious Record Collectors 23 (March–April): 94–96.

External links
 Vakhtang Jordania International Conducting Competition
 Angelok1 website

1943 births
2005 deaths
Conductors (music) from Georgia (country)
Soviet defectors to the United States
Musicians from Tbilisi
Deaths from cancer in Virginia
Tbilisi State Conservatoire alumni
Soviet conductors (music)
People from Broadway, Virginia
20th-century conductors (music)